Mark Leonard may refer to:

 Mark Leonard (baseball) (born 1964), Major League Baseball outfielder
 Mark Leonard (footballer) (born 1962), English footballer
 Mark Leonard, charged in Richmond Hill explosion
 Mark Leonard (director) (born 1974), founder of the European Council on Foreign Relations

See also 
Mark Lenard, American actor